Fritigil (or Fritigils), Queen of the Marcomanni, is the last known ruler of the Germanic peoples who were at that time (late 4th century) probably settled in Pannonia. She is alleged to have had her residence in the present Burgenland. Fritigil corresponded with Ambrose of Milan for the conversion of her people to Christianity. She convinced her husband to submit to Roman authority and the tribe fell under the power of a tribune according to the Notitia Dignitatum.

Pope John Paul II referred to Fritigil in his letter Operosam Diem:

Has quidem normas sectabatur Mediolanensis Episcopus sua etiam in catechesi, quae singulari omnino vi audientes captabat. Eam plures sunt experti. Longinqua illa regina Marcomannorum Fritigil, ipsius fama adducta, scripsit ei ut super catholica religione informaretur recepitque vicissim «epistulam ... praeclaram in modum catechismi».

Ambrose died on year 397, before Fritigil reached Milan to meet him.

References

Sources
Fritigil, markomannische Königin.
John Paul II. Operosam Diem. 1996. 
Notitia Dignitatum:  Latin text with pictures, from Bibliotheca Augustana.

Ancient queens regnant
4th-century Germanic people
Germanic women
Marcomannic rulers
4th-century women rulers
4th-century monarchs in Europe